The Diocese of Trivento is a Latin Church ecclesiastical territory or diocese of the Catholic Church in Italy. The Diocese of Trivento is a suffragan diocese in the ecclesiastical province of the metropolitan Archdiocese of Campobasso-Boiano, in the ecclesiastical region of Abruzzo-Molise, southern Italy.

The cathedral  is Cattedrale di Ss. Nazario, Celso e Vittore, dedicated to the diocesan patron saints St. Nazarius, St. Celsus and St. Victor, in the episcopal see of Trivento, Campobasso province, in Molise administrative region. The other major sanctuary is at Canneto, in the commune Roccavivara, founded in the fourth century and until the tenth dependent on Montecassino.

History 
According to local legend the earliest bishop of Trivento was St. Castus of an uncertain epoch, assigning him to the fourth century. 
 Established in 940 as Diocese of Trivento / Triventin(us) (Latin adjective). Historically the diocese was a suffragan of the Archdiocese of Benevento.
 In 1977 it gained territory from the Benedictine Territorial Abbacy of Montecassino, and lost territory to the Diocese of Sulmona.

Statistics and extent 
 , it pastorally served 51,786 Catholics (99.8% of 51,903 total) on 1,234 km² in 58 parishes with 52 priests (50 diocesan, 2 religious), 1 deacon, 46 lay religious (2 brothers, 44 sisters) and 6 seminarians.
 It comprises four deaneries - Agnone, Carovilli, Frosolone and Trivento - covering 40 commune (municipalities) in three administrative provinces : 
 in the Province of Campobasso : Trivento, Casalciprano, Castropignano, Duronia, Fossalto, Molise, Montefalcone nel Sannio, Pietracupa, Roccavivara, Salcito, San Biase e Torella del Sannio;
 in the Province of Isernia : Agnone, Bagnoli del Trigno, Belmonte del Sannio, Capracotta, Carovilli, Castel del Giudice, Castelverrino, Chiauci, Civitanova del Sannio, Frosolone, Montenero Val Cocchiara, Pescolanciano, Pescopennataro, Pietrabbondante, Poggio Sannita, Rionero Sannitico, San Pietro Avellana, Sant'Angelo del Pesco e Vastogirardi;
 in the Province of Chieti : Borrello, Castelguidone, Castiglione Messer Marino, Celenza sul Trigno, Roio del Sangro, Rosello, San Giovanni Lipioni, Schiavi di Abruzzo e Torrebruna.

Episcopal ordinaries

Bishops of Trivento

 the monk Leo, intruded and deposed by Pope Agapetus II (946)
 Gaydulfo (1001–1015)
 Alferio (Alferius) (1084–1119)
 Giovanni (1160–?)
 Raone (1175–?)
 Ponzio (1175–?)
 Tommaso (1226–1237)
 Riccardo (1240–?)
 Nicola (1256–?)
 Odorico (1258–?)
 Luca, Conventual? Friars Minor (O.F.M.) (1258–1266), exiled by king Manfred, King of Sicily? (1258–1266)
 Pace (1266–?)
 Giacomo (1290–1315)
 Natimbene, Augustinians (O.E.S.A.) (1333 – death 1344), previously Bishop of Avellino (Italy) (1326.02.21 – 1333)
 Giordano Curti (1344 – 1348.05.30), next Metropolitan Archbishop of Messina (Sicily, Italy) (1348.05.30 – 1348)
 Pietro dell' Aquila, O.F.M. (30 May 1348 – death Nov 1361) previously Bishop of Sant’Angelo dei Lombardi (Italy) (1347.02.12 – 1348.06.29)
 Guglielmo M. Farinerio, O.F.M. (1356–1368)
 Francesco De Ruberto (1370–1379)
 Ruggiero De Carcasils (1379–1387)
 Pietro Ferillo (1387–?)
 Giacomo (1409–?)
 Giovanni (1431 – death 1433)
 Giacomo De Tertiis, O.S.B. (1452.09.27 – ?)
 Tommaso Carafa (1473.08.13 – ?), previously Bishop of Pozzuoli (Italy) (1470 – 1473.08.13)
 Bonifacio Troiano (1498–?)
Leonardo Carmini (Leonardo Corbera) (21 Nov 1498 – 1502 Died)
Tommaso Caracciolo (archbishop of Capua) (16 Mar 1502 – 1540 Resigned) 
Matteo Griffoni Pioppi, O.S.B. (15 Nov 1540 – 9 Apr 1567 Died) 
Giovanni Fabrizio Sanseverino (1568 Appointed – ) 
Giulio Cesare Mariconda, O.F.M. (1582–1606 Died) 
Paolo del Lago (Bisnetti), O.F.M. (29 Jan 1607 – 24 Dec 1621 Died) 
Girolamo Costanzo (9 Jan 1623 – 1 Mar 1627 Appointed, Archbishop of Capua) 
Martín de León Cárdenas, O.S.A. (13 May 1630 – 7 Apr 1631 Appointed, Bishop of Pozzuoli) 
Carolus Scaglia, Can. Reg. S.Geor (12 May 1631 – Dec 1645 Died) 
Giovanni Battista Capacci (16 Jul 1646 – 1652 Died) 
Giovanni de la Cruz, O.F.M. (20 Jan 1653 – 1654 Died) 
Giovanni Battista Ferruzzo, C.O. (14 Jan 1655 – Aug 1658 Died) 
Vincenzo Lanfranchi, C.R. (5 May 1660 – 7 Dec 1665)  (promoted Archbishop of Acerenza e Matera) 
Ambrogio Maria Piccolomini, O.S.B. (5 May 1666 – 27 May 1675) (promoted Archbishop of Otranto) 
Diego Ibáñez de la Madrid y Bustamente (10 Apr 1679 – 2 Oct 1684) (promoted Bishop of Pozzuoli) 
Antonio Tortorelli, O.F.M. (13 Nov 1684 – 10 Jan 1715 Died) 
Alfonso Miraconda, O.S.B. (12 Jul 1717 – 11 Dec 1730)  restored the cathedral (promoted Archbishop of Acerenza e Matera) 
Fortunato Palumbo, O.S.B. (18 Dec 1730 – 19 Jul 1753 Died) 
Giuseppe Maria Carafa, C.R. (22 Jul 1754 – 19 Jul 1756 Appointed, Bishop of Mileto) 
Giuseppe Pitocco (19 Jul 1756 – 30 May 1771 Died) 
Gioacchino Paglione (23 Sep 1771 – Dec 1790 Died) 
Luca Nicola de Luca (26 Mar 1792 – 7 Jun 1819 Resigned) 
Bernardino D'Avolio, O.F.M. Cap. (21 Feb 1820 – 18 Jul 1821 Died) 
Giovanni De Simone, C.M. (19 Apr 1822 – 3 Jul 1826 Confirmed, Bishop of Conversano) 
Michele Arcangelo Del Forno (9 Apr 1827 – 18 Mar 1830 Resigned) 
Antonio Perchiacca (2 Jul 1832 – 26 Nov 1836 Died) 
Benedetto Terenzio (19 May 1837 – 27 Jan 1854 Died) 
Luigi Agazio, O.F.M. (23 Jun 1854 – 1 Feb 1887 Died) 
Domenico (Daniele) Tempesta, O.F.M. (14 Mar 1887 – 4 Jun 1891 Appointed, Bishop of Troia) 
Giulio Vaccaro (4 Jun 1891 – 30 Nov 1896 Appointed, Coadjutor Archbishop of Trani e Barletta (e Nazareth e Bisceglie)) 
Carlo Pietropaoli (19 Apr 1897 – 29 Apr 1913 Resigned) 
Antonio Lega (25 May 1914 – 13 Jun 1921 Appointed, Coadjutor Archbishop of Ravenna) 
Geremia Pascucci (12 Sep 1922 – 14 May 1926 Died) 
Attilio Adinolfi (27 Feb 1928 – 5 May 1931 Appointed, Bishop of Anagni) 
Giovanni Giorgis (30 Sep 1931 – 14 Jul 1937 Appointed, Bishop of Fiesole) 
Epimenio Giannico (7 Sep 1937 – 24 Jun 1957 Died) 
Pio Agostino Crivellari, O.F.M. (7 Feb 1958 – 3 Feb 1966 Died) 
Achille Palmerini (18 Mar 1972 – 18 Mar 1975 Resigned) 
Enzio d'Antonio (18 Mar 1975 –  1977 Resigned) 
Antonio Valentini (17 Oct 1977 – 31 Dec 1984 Appointed, Archbishop of Chieti) 
Antonio Santucci (8 May 1985 – 17 Oct 2005 Retired) 
Domenico Angelo Scotti (17 Oct 2005 – )
 Bishop-elect Claudio Palumbo (5 June 2017 – )

See also 
 List of Catholic dioceses in Italy

References

Sources and external links 
 GCatholic with Google map - data for all sections

 Bibliography Books
  (in Latin)
 
 
 
 Italo M. Iasiello, Samnium: assetti e trasformazioni di una provincia dell'Italia tardoantica, Edipuglia, Bari 2007, pp. 139–140
 Francesco Lanzoni, Le diocesi d'Italia dalle origini al principio del secolo VII (an. 604), vol. I, Faenza 1927, p. 379
 Giuseppe Cappelletti, Le chiese d'Italia dalla loro origine sino ai nostri giorni, Venice 1870, vol. XXI, pp. 469–473
 Valeria Cocozza, Chiesa e società a Trivento. Storia di una diocesi di regio patronato in età spagnola, Thesis laureate 2012-2013

Trivento